Bury Me at Makeout Creek (stylized in all lowercase) is the third studio album by Japanese-American indie rock musician Mitski, released through Double Double Whammy on November 11, 2014. The album was written entirely by Mitski, with production handled by Patrick Hyland, who also produced her previous record, Retired from Sad, New Career in Business (2013). The title of the album is a quote from the Simpsons episode "Faith Off".

Background and release
After graduating from Purchase College's Conservatory of Music, where she studied studio compositions and released her first two albums as student projects, Mitski learned to play the guitar and began work on her third studio album. The projects, combined with completing her degree while working outside jobs to pay rent, left Mitski exhausted, a state which heavily influenced the creation of the album. The album was recorded mostly in houses and makeshift studios with a select group of musicians and friends and represented a departure from Mitski's classical training showcased in her orchestral, piano-based first two albums.

The lead single of the album, "First Love / Late Spring", was released on May 15, 2014, with Double Double Whammy announcing Mitski joined their label roster and will release a full-length record later that year. The album was announced on September 16 alongside the release of the second single, "Townie". Two music videos were released for "Townie", the first directed by Allyssa Yohana and premiered on Rookie on November 9, 2014, and the second directed by Faye Orlove and premiered on The Fader on March 9, 2015. She released two more singles, "I Don't Smoke" on September 29 and "I Will" on October 21.

The album was reissued with four new bonus tracks on April 7, 2015, through Don Giovanni Records. In 2016, the album was released under Mitski's new label Dead Oceans.

Critical reception

Bury Me at Makeout Creek received acclaim from music critics. Writing for Pitchfork, Ian Cohen said, "though not necessarily nostalgic, the sound of Bury Me at Makeout Creek, the impressive third album from Mitski Miyawaki, is inventive and resourceful in a '90s-indie way," concluding the review saying the album "still sounds like a breakthrough even if nothing's coming up Mitski in these songs." Consequence of Sounds Sasha Geffen said "love and death and violence all smash into each other throughout the record, which delicately balances on a thin line between polished, academic pop music and unhinged punk rock," adding: "Mitski's grip on melody, pacing, and composition is tight from years of practice, but the raw energy with which she applies it is what brings Make Out Creek to life. Her courage as a musician distinguishes her more than any amount of training. Here, it's on full display." Rolling Stone Paula Mejia wrote, "Bury Me is edged with heavy riffs that at various times recall Black Sabbath and even Liz Phair. But it's Mitski's talent for penning deep-cutting lyrics that makes this album soar."

Concluding the review for AllMusic, Marcy Donelson called the album an "auspicious if fatalistic label debut" and described it as "Grungy, impulsive, and with memorably acerbic, vulnerable lyrics."

In popular culture
The song "Francis Forever" was covered by Marceline the Vampire Queen in the episode "The Music Hole" from the eighth season of Adventure Time.

Track listing

Personnel
Credits adapted from the album's liner notes.

 Mitski – music, performance, album art
 Patrick Hyland – production, performance, additional vocals, mastering
 Partick Linehan – performance
 Will Prinzi – performance
 Dave Benton – additional vocals
 John Molfetas – additional vocals

Charts

References

External links
 

2014 albums
Dead Oceans albums
Don Giovanni Records albums
Mitski albums
Double Double Whammy albums